Krimūna Parish is an administrative unit of Dobele Municipality, Latvia.

Towns, villages and settlements of Krimūna Parish 
Krimūnas
Akācijas
Ceriņi
Lauciņi
Parūķis
Degumuiža

References 

Dobele Municipality
Parishes of Latvia